Łowicz Główny railway station (Polish for Łowicz Main station) is a railway station serving the town of Łowicz, in the Łódź Voivodeship, Poland. The station opened in 1861 and is located on the Warsaw–Kunowice railway, Skierniewice–Łowicz railway and Łowicz–Łódź railway. The train services are operated by PKP, Koleje Mazowieckie, Łódzka Kolej Aglomeracyjna and Przewozy Regionalne.

Train services
The station is served by the following service(s):

Intercity services Szczecin - Stargard - Krzyz - Poznan - Kutno - Lowicz - Warsaw - Lublin - Rzeszow - Przemysl
Intercity services Szczecin - Stargard - Krzyz - Poznan - Kutno - Lowicz - Warsaw - Bialystok
Intercity services Wroclaw - Ostrow Wielkopolskie - Jarocin - Poznan - Kutno - Lowicz - Warsaw
Intercity services Kolobrzeg - Pila - Bydgoszcz - Torun - Kutno - Lowicz - Warsaw
Intercity services Gorzow Wielkopolskie - Krzyz - Pila - Bydgoszcz - Torun - Kutno - Lowicz - Warsaw
Intercity services Szczecin - Pila - Bydgoszcz - Torun - Kutno - Lowicz - Warsaw - Lublin - Rzeszow - Przemysl
Intercity services Gdynia - Gdansk - Bydgoszcz - Torun - Kutno - Lowicz - Warsaw - Lublin - Rzeszow - Zagorz/Przemysl
Intercity services Szczecin - Stargard - Krzyz - Poznan - Kutno - Lowicz - Lodz - Krakow
Intercity services Bydgoszcz - Gniezno - Poznan - Kutno - Lowicz - Lodz - Krakow
Regional services (KM) Kutno - Lowicz - Sochaczew - Blonie - Warsaw
Regional services (R) Kutno - Lowicz - Skierniewice
Regional services (LKA) Lowicz - Strykow - Zgierz - Lodz
Regional services (LKA) Lowicz - Skierniewice

References

 Station article at kolej.one.pl
 This article is based upon a translation of the Polish language version as of July 2016.

External links
 

Railway stations in Poland opened in 1861
Railway stations in Łódź Voivodeship
Railway stations served by Koleje Mazowieckie
Łowicz County
Railway stations served by Przewozy Regionalne InterRegio
1861 establishments in the Russian Empire
Railway stations served by Łódzka Kolej Aglomeracyjna